The administrative geography of the United Kingdom is complex, multi-layered and non-uniform. The United Kingdom, a sovereign state to the northwest of continental Europe, consists of England, Northern Ireland, Scotland and Wales. For local government in the United Kingdom, England, Northern Ireland, Scotland and Wales each have their own system of administrative and geographic demarcation. Consequently, there is "no common stratum of administrative unit encompassing the United Kingdom".

Because there is no written document that comprehensively encompasses the British constitution, and owing to a convoluted history of the formation of the United Kingdom, a variety of terms are used to refer to its constituent parts, which are sometimes called the four countries of the United Kingdom. The four are sometimes collectively referred to as the Home Nations, particularly in sporting contexts. Although the four countries are important for legal and governmental purposes, they are not comparable to administrative subdivisions of most other countries.

The United Kingdom also contains 17 dependent territories which aren't officially a part of the UK but are represented by it in places like the UN.

Historically, the subnational divisions of the UK have been the county and the ecclesiastical parish, whilst following the emergence of a unified parliament of the United Kingdom, the ward and constituency have been pan-UK political subdivisions. More contemporary divisions include Lieutenancy areas and the statistical territories defined with the modern ITL (formerly NUTS) and ISO 3166-2:GB systems.

History

This structure was formed by the union agreed between the former sovereign states, the Kingdom of England (including the Principality of Wales) and the Kingdom of Scotland in the Treaty of Union and enacted by the Acts of Union 1707 to form the single Kingdom of Great Britain (1707–1800); followed by the Act of Union 1800, which combined Great Britain with the Kingdom of Ireland to form the United Kingdom of Great Britain and Ireland. The independence of the Irish Free State in 1922, following the partition of Ireland, resulted in the present-day United Kingdom of Great Britain and Northern Ireland.

Wales was incorporated into the English legal system through the Laws in Wales Acts 1535-1542, the earlier Statute of Rhuddlan having restricted but not abolished Welsh Law following the Edwardian conquest in 1282.  As a result, England and Wales are treated as a single entity for some purposes, principally that they share a legal system (see English law), while Scotland and Northern Ireland each have a separate legal system (see Scots Law and Northern Ireland law).

Northern Ireland was the first part of the British Isles to have a devolved government, under the Government of Ireland Act 1920, and that continued until the Parliament of Northern Ireland was suspended in 1972. After a period of direct rule by the Westminster government and some abortive attempts at reinstating devolved government during the Troubles, the present-day Northern Ireland Assembly was established in 1998, and is currently in operation following a number of periods of suspension. The complex history of Northern Ireland has led to differing views as to its status. The term "Province" is often used by unionist and British commentators to refer to Northern Ireland, but not by nationalists.

Overview of administration

Following Brexit the UK ONS replaced the EU NUTS1 regional model with its own International Territorial Level model, continuing the treatment of the 3 Home Nations alongside the 9 Regions of England.

Notes

The markers above link to relevant articles where available.

 Can have city, borough or royal borough status
 Has a council
 Has a legislature
 May have a council
 Sui generis unitary authority.  Not a county nor part of Cornwall.  Powers similar to a mainland county.
 Can have city, town, village or neighbourhood status.  Not all areas of England have parishes.
 County council areas comprising one district.  The council is at either county or district level.

Local government

England 

England has no devolved national legislature or government.

The highest level subdivisions of England are the nine regions. The London region, known as Greater London, is further divided into the City of London and 32 London boroughs. This is administered by the Greater London Authority, including the directly elected London Assembly. The other regions are made up of metropolitan and non-metropolitan counties and unitary authorities. The counties are further divided into districts (which can be called cities, boroughs, royal boroughs, metropolitan boroughs or districts). The unitary authorities effectively combine the functions of counties and districts.

Below the district level, civil parishes exist, though not uniformly.  Parish or town councils exist for villages and small towns; they only rarely exist for communities within urban areas.

Commonly, though not administratively, England's geography is divided into ceremonial counties, which in most areas closely mirror the traditional counties. Each ceremonial county has a Lord Lieutenant, who is the monarch's representative.

Northern Ireland

Northern Ireland has the Northern Ireland Assembly and Northern Ireland Executive established under the Good Friday Agreement. During periods where the devolved institutions were suspended, executive government in Northern Ireland was administered directly by the Secretary of State for Northern Ireland and laws made in the United Kingdom Parliament – known as "direct rule" in contrast to devolution.

For local government, Northern Ireland is divided into 11 districts, which are unitary authorities.

Northern Ireland is divided into six traditional counties.  Though widely used, these no longer serve any administrative purpose.

Scotland 

Scotland has a devolved legislature, the Scottish Parliament, with a government, the Scottish Executive, since 1999. Since 2007 the Scottish Executive has been called the Scottish government.

For local government, Scotland has 32 council areas (unitary authorities). Below this uniform level of subdivision, there are varying levels of area committees in the larger rural council areas, and many small community councils throughout the country, although these are not universal. Scottish community councils have few if any powers beyond being a forum for raising issues of concern.

Wales 

Wales has an elected, devolved legislature, the Senedd (Welsh Parliament), from which the Welsh Government is drawn.
For local government, Wales consists of 22 unitary authorities: 10 county boroughs, 9 Counties, and 3 Cities.  Below these are community councils, which have powers similar to those of English parish councils.

Wales is also divided into preserved counties, which are used for ceremonial purposes.  Although based on the counties used for local government between 1974 and 1996, they no longer have an administrative function.

Democratic representation

Parliaments

Each of the 650 electoral areas or divisions called constituencies of the Parliament of the United Kingdom has, since 1950, elected one Member of Parliament (MP) to represent it at the House of Commons of the United Kingdom.  Before 1950, some constituencies elected two or more MPs using the plurality bloc vote system, and before the Reform Act 1832 nearly all constituencies in England returned two MPs.

The devolved Scottish Parliament, the Welsh Senedd both use an additional member system of elections, which combines single-member constituencies with multi-member electoral regions.

Elections to the Northern Ireland Assembly are held under the single transferable vote (STV) system, in 18 multi-member constituencies.

Local government
The wards and electoral divisions of the United Kingdom are electoral districts at subnational level represented by one or more councillors at local authority level, or else used to divide the electorate into electoral districts for voting. It is the primary unit of British electoral geography.

Informal divisions

There are also many informal, historical and special purpose regional designations. Some such as the Highlands of Scotland have or have had, to some extent, formal boundaries. Others such as the London commuter belt are more diffuse. Some such as Snowdonia (Eryri) have a formal boundary in some contexts; in this case as a National Park. Others such as The Fens of eastern England are quite distinctly defined by geography but do not form any official entity.

International subdivisions
The UK's Office for National Statistics, the International Organization for Standardization and before 2021 Eurostat, have developed subdivision codes for the UK. See ITL (UK) and ISO 3166-2:GB.

Dependent territories

The United Kingdom has 17 dependent territories in total: three "Crown Dependencies" in the British Isles and in the English Channel and fourteen "overseas territories" scattered around the world.

Unlike other former colonial powers, the British Government does not classify its overseas possessions (or the crown dependencies, which share historical ties with the British Crown) as subdivisions of the United Kingdom itself; rather, each is treated in law as a separate jurisdiction. Most have their own legislatures and a degree of autonomy usually exceeding that of the devolved UK nations, including fiscal independence.

Out of the 14 overseas territories, 10 are autonomous, two used primarily as military bases, one uninhabited, and one an Antarctic claim.

However, the UK retains varying degrees of responsibility in all of the territories, currently ranging from full political control to a largely ceremonial presence. The main reserved matters are the areas of diplomacy, international treaties, defence and security. The UK also retains in all territories a residual responsibility for 'good governance', a loosely defined constitutional concept recently exemplified by its imposition of direct rule following alleged serious corruption in the Turks and Caicos Islands. The UK parliament at Westminster, and the British Government through the Privy Council, both retain the power to legislate for the overseas territories – though by convention will usually only do so with each local government's consent.

The three Crown Dependencies within the British Isles are self-governing possessions of the British Crown. They are distinct from the British overseas territories of the United Kingdom.

See also 
Countries of the United Kingdom
Devolution in the United Kingdom
European Parliament constituencies in the United Kingdom
British Isles (terminology)
British Overseas Territories
Crown Dependencies
Etymological list of counties of the United Kingdom
List of subnational entities
Office for National Statistics coding system for counties, districts, wards and census areas
List of regions of the United Kingdom by Human Development Index

References

External links
Browsable list of all UK local authorities' contact details and websites on the Business Link website
Beginners' guide to UK geography – administrative geography

Geography of the United Kingdom
Government of the United Kingdom
United Kingdom
 
United Kingdom by country